The 2022–23 Donar season is the 51st season in the existence of the club. The club will play its second season of the BNXT League.

Donar will play in the regular season of the 2022–23 FIBA Europe Cup, having qualified as winners of the national cup.

From this season, Drago Pašalić is the new technical director of the club.

Players

Squad information

Transactions

Additions

Out 

|}

Retirements

Extensions

Pre-season 

Key

 H: Home game
 A: Away game
 N: Neutral

References

External links 

 Donar website

Donar (basketball club)
Donar
Donar (basketball club) seasons